Ilyas Sitapuri (October 30, 1934 – October 1, 2003)  was a Pakistani historical fiction writer. He is known for writing historical stories for Sabrang Digest and Suspense Digest. His popular stories and novels include, Kashmir Ki Kali, Daastan-e-Hoor, Bala Khanay Ki Dulhan, and Sikandar-e-Azam.

Early life
Sitapuri was born as Muhammad Ilyas Khan on October 30, 1934, in Sitapur, British India. His family belonged to the Yusufzai tribe who had migrated to Sitapur during the era of Mughal emperor Shah Jahan. In 1952, he migrated to Pakistan and settled in Karachi.

Writing career
Sitapuri started his writing career with children stories in the late 1940s. At the age of 16, he penned his first novel, "Shakar". After coming to Pakistan, he struggled as a writer and worked for different publishing institutions. In 1970, he was introduced to Shakeel Adilzada, the editor of Sabrang Digest. Then, he wrote his first historical story for the digest, Khan-e-Azam Ka Tohfa that was published in January 1971. He continued writing for Sabrang Digest until 1974. Then, in January 1975, he joined Suspense Digest and continuously wrote for it until his death.
Ilyas Sitapuri's stories and novels have also been published in India by the Shama Book Depot, (Delhi).

Writing style
Sitapuri makes historical facts live with fictional characters and vivid scripts, so that the readers find themselves actually walking in the remote era. He intelligently portrays human instincts and psychology while writing about historical events.

Personal life
Sitapuri was married to Zia Tasneem Bilgrami who also used to write Islamic biographies in Suspense Digest. Both had 5 daughters and 3 sons. One of their daughters Zanobia is a performing artist and a journalist.

Popular stories/novels
Some famous historical stories and novels of Ilyas Sitapuri include:
 Ajaib Khana e Ishq
 Dastan E Hoor
 Haram Sara
 Raag Ka Badan
 Chand Ka Khuda
 Andar Ka Admi
 Bala Khanay Ki Dulhan
 Sikandar E Azam
 Razm Bazm
 Ashna Na Ashna
 Parsayee Ka Khumar
 Awara Garad Badsha

Death
Sitpuri died on October 1, 2003, in Karachi.

References

1934 births
2003 deaths
People from Sitapur
Pakistani novelists
Pakistani historical fiction writers
Pakistani short story writers
Pakistani historical novelists
Urdu-language writers from Pakistan